Philip Stremmel (April 16, 1880 – December 26, 1947) was an American professional baseball pitcher. In 7 career games, he had a 0-4 record, with a 4.02 ERA. He batted and threw right-handed.

Peterman was born in Zanesville, Ohio and died in Chicago.

External links
Baseball Reference.com page

1880 births
1947 deaths
St. Louis Browns players
Major League Baseball pitchers
Baseball players from Ohio
People from Zanesville, Ohio
Minor league baseball managers
Green Bay Colts players
Green Bay Orphans players
Superior Blues players
Columbus Senators players
Zanesville Potters players
Dayton Veterans players